Aeos, Æos, or variation, may refer to:

 Aeos, the mythological horse that drew the Sun Chariot with 3 other horses across the sky with the Greek god Helios, see Helios (god)
 3.67 m Advanced Electro Optical System Telescope (AEOS) at the Air Force Maui Optical and Supercomputing observatory
 Cummins Aeos, the "AEOS", an electric semi-truck tractor unit from Cummins

See also
 AEO (disambiguation) for the singular of Aeos.
 AOS (disambiguation)
 Eos (disambiguation)